Lisa Wu (born January 23, 1973) is an American television personality, actress, realtor, screenwriter and designer. She is best known for appearing on reality series The Real Housewives of Atlanta and Hollywood Divas.

Early life 
Lisa was born and raised in Inglewood, California as one of nine children. Her father, Stanley Wu, is a first-generation Chinese-American and her mother, Victoria Brislis-Wu, was of Afro-Caribbean descent. She has said that her family was often the target of discriminatory comments in their neighborhood.

Career 

Wu started her career as a backup dancer for musical artists and bands such as Public Enemy, EPMD, and Candyman. Shortly after this, she joined the rap group 9tene. After leaving music, Wu wrote, produced, and acted in the film Black Ball (2003). She remained in the film industry for many years as a screenwriter, producer, and an actress.

Wu was cast in the inaugural season of Bravo's The Real Housewives of Atlanta. She appeared in the main cast for the first two seasons (2008–09) and was a guest for the third season (2010–11). She ultimately made guest appearances further on in the ninth, tenth, and fourteenth seasons, respectively.

Wu is the author of a novel called When The Cake is Made. The novel was published in 2010 following her departure from RHOA.

Since her departure from RHOA, Wu has continued her career as an actress and producer. From 2014 until 2016, she was a cast member with four other actresses working on a short film, The White Sistas, on the TV One series Hollywood Divas.

Personal life  
One of nine children, Wu's elder brother, Meho, is deceased, and Wu was seen grieving over his death in a Season 2 episode of RHOA, during the build-up to an anniversary of his death.

From 1992 until 2002, Wu was married to Keith Sweat. The couple have two sons, Jordan (b. 1995) and Justin (b. 1998).

In 2005, Wu married Ed Hartwell, and the couple had one son, Ed, Jr. Ed Hartwell filed for divorce on August 24, 2011; it was finalized October 7, 2011, with the court document giving her name as Sharon Millette Hartwell.

Filmography

Film

Television

References

External links 
 

Living people
1973 births
American actresses of Chinese descent
American film actresses
American film producers
American people of Caribbean descent
American people of Chinese descent
American television actresses
African-American television personalities
African-American actresses
The Real Housewives of Atlanta
The Real Housewives cast members
American women film producers
People from Inglewood, California
People from Atlanta
21st-century African-American people
21st-century African-American women
20th-century African-American people
20th-century African-American women